Phobos, in comics, may refer to:

 Phobos (Marvel Comics), a Marvel Comics character and son of Ares
 Phobos (DC Comics), a DC Comics supervillain and enemy of Wonder Woman
 Phobos, a character in Jack Kirby's Galactic Bounty Hunters

See also
Phobos (disambiguation)

References